Norfolk Island competed at the 2011 Pacific Games in Nouméa, New Caledonia between August 27 and September 10, 2011. As of June 28, 2011 Norfolk Island has listed 13 competitors.

Athletics

Norfolk Island has qualified 1 athlete.

Men
Daniel Griffiths

Golf

Norfolk Island has qualified 4 athletes.

Men
Darren Anderson
Ronan Davies
Tom Greenwood
Blake O'Hara

Shooting

Norfolk Island has qualified 3 athletes.

Andrew Barnett
Clinton Judd
Mitchell Meers

References

2011 in Norfolk Island
Nations at the 2011 Pacific Games
Norfolk Island at the Pacific Games